"Dheere Dheere" is a song by the Indian recording artist Yo Yo Honey Singh. He recorded this song on his iPhone and composed it on his laptop during his Bipolar Disorder. The track was released on 31 August 2015 as a single on Hotstar. It is a cover version of the Bollywood filmi-ghazal song "Dheere Dheere Se" music by Nadeem–Shravan, lyrics by Rani Malik, Singing by Anuradha Paudwal & Kumar Sanu, from the 1990 all-time blockbuster Bollywood film soundtrack album Aashiqui. It was released on YouTube by T-Series on 2 September 2015.

Music video
The accompanying music video, directed by Ahmed Khan, was shot in Antalya, Turkey. The video features Bollywood actors Hrithik Roshan and Sonam Kapoor.

Reception 
The song has received commercial success, peaking at the number one position on YouTube India views, crossing five million views in 4 days of its release; and over 18 million views in a week. It also reached number one position on BBC Asian Download Charts in September 2015. In January 2016, the music video crossed 100million views on YouTube. As of June 2022, the song has received over 530million views on YouTube.

References 

2015 singles
2015 songs
Ghazal songs
Hindi film songs
Hindi songs
Indian songs
Number-one singles in India
Punjabi-language songs
T-Series (company) singles
Urdu-language songs
Yo Yo Honey Singh songs